American recording artist Alicia Keys has appeared in numerous music. Her videography includes more than thirty music videos and three video albums. In 2000, Keys signed a recording contract with J Records and released her debut single "Fallin', taken from her first studio album Songs in A minor (2001). The plot of its music video had Keys traveling to a prison to visit her incarcerated boyfriend and was continued in the video for her next single, "A Woman's Worth;" both videos marked Keys' first collaboration with director Chris Robinson, who would become a regular collaborator later. In 2004, another regular, American director Diane Martel, directed the accompanying music video for the second single from the singer's second album The Diary of Alicia Keys, "If I Ain't Got You", which featured rapper Method Man as Keys' love interest. It won the Best R&B Video accolade at the 2004 MTV Video Music Awards.

In 2008, Keys collaborated with former The White Stripes singer Jack White on "Another Way to Die", the theme song for the James Bond film Quantum of Solace. Inspired by the plot, the CGI-heavy clip garnered a largely positive response from critics and was nominated for Best Short Form Music Video at the 51st Grammy Awards.

Music videos

As lead artist

As featured artist

Guest appearances

Unreleased music videos

Video albums

Filmography

Film and television

Web

Theatre

Commercials

References

Keys, Alicia